A scallion pancake, also known as a green onion pancake or spring onion pancake is a kind of pancake made with scallions. It is usually chewy, flaky, and savory. 

Examples include:
 Cōng yóu bǐng, a Chinese pancake made with scallions
 Pajeon, a Korean pancake made with scallions

See also
List of onion dishes

Onion-based foods
Scallion dishes

List of Korean pancakes